Phyllobius arborator is a species of broad-nosed weevils belonging to the family Curculionidae, subfamily Entiminae.

This beetle is present in most of Europe.

The soil-living larvae feed on the roots of host plants, while the adults feed on leaves of deciduous trees and shrubs.

The colour of the body is metallic blue-green.

References

External links 
 Biolib
 Fauna europaea

Entiminae
Beetles of Europe
Beetles described in 1797